Čierna Lehota is a village and municipality in the Rožňava District in the Košice Region of eastern Slovakia.

History
In historical records the village was first mentioned in 1389.

Geography
The village lies at an altitude of 521 metres and covers an area of 31.864 km².
It has a population of about 575 people.

Ethnicity
The population is about 96% Slovak in ethnicity.

Culture
The village has a small public library, a football pitch and a food store.

Genealogical resources

The records for genealogical research are available at the state archive "Statny Archiv in Banska Bystrica, Kosice, Slovakia"

 Greek Catholic church records (births/marriages/deaths): 1818-1895 (parish B)
 Lutheran church records (births/marriages/deaths): 1785-1947 (parish A)

See also
 List of municipalities and towns in Slovakia

External links
http://www.statistics.sk/mosmis/eng/run.html
Surnames of living people in Cierna Lehota

Villages and municipalities in Rožňava District